Hans Lohmeyer (23 June 1881 in Thorn – 28 February 1968 in Berlin) was a German jurist, Lord Mayor of Königsberg.

Life
By the time the war ended he had already become involved with the Evangelical Church in Königsberg.   Following a period of ethnic cleansing Königsberg was no longer a German city, however.   Within postwar Germany Lohmeyer settled in what had become the Soviet occupation zone and became a synod member of the Evangelical Church in Berlin, Brandenburg and Silesian Upper Lusatia.   He also belonged to the so-called Prussian Union of churches.   In 1951 he co-founded the "Association for Communal Studies" ("Verein für Kommunalwissenschaften"), becoming its chairman in 1963.

He is buried in Berlin.

Selected works 
 Zentralismus oder Selbstverwaltung. Ein Beitrag zur Verfassungs- und Verwaltungsreform. Berlin: Carl Heymanns Verlag, Berlin 1928, IV, 87 S.
 Die Politik des Zweiten Reiches 1870–1918. 2 Bände. Berlin: Neff, Band 1: 1939, 555 S.; Band 2: 1939, 578 S.
Die städtischen Betriebe. Königsberg 1924
Rückblick auf meine Amtszeit, 1957
Meine Königsberger Jahre, 1961

Literature 
  , vol 2/1925, p. 28
 Helge Dvorak: Biographisches Lexikon der Deutschen Burschenschaft vol. I Politiker, Teilband 3: I–L. Heidelberg 1999, S. 309–311.
 
 Eckert Vogel: Dem Königsberger Oberbürgermeister Dr. Hans Lohmeyer zum Gedächtnis. Königsberger Bürgerbrief 65 (2005), p. 59 f
 Hans Lohmeyer Munzinger archive 37/1956 of 3 September 1956

References

External links 
 
 Verein für Kommunalwissenschaften

German jurists
Commanders Crosses of the Order of Merit of the Federal Republic of Germany
1881 births
1968 deaths